Mynn is an English surname. Notable people with this surname include:

 Alfred Mynn (1807–1861), English cricket player
 Charles Mynn Thruston (1798–1873), American soldier, farmer and politician
 Charles Mynn Thruston (colonel) (1738–1812), American soldier
 Nicholas Mynn (fl. 1558–1572), English politician
 Walter Mynn (1805–1878), English amateur cricket player who played between 1833 and 1852

See also
 MYNN is the ICAO code of Lynden Pindling International Airport, Bahamas